Flight 585 may refer to:

 United Airlines Flight 585, crashed approaching Colorado Springs in 1991 — rudder control failure 
 Laoag International Airlines Flight 585, crashed into Manila Bay after take-off in 2002 — pilot error 
United Airways Flight 585, had an engine failure over Raipur in 2015, currently stored 

0585